Arthrostylidium fimbriatum is a species of Arthrostylidium bamboo in the grass family. The species are native to Central America, the West Indies, northern South America, and southern Mexico.

References 

fimbriatum